Omladinski stadion (Youth's Stadium) is a multi-purpose stadium in Belgrade, Serbia. It is currently used mostly for football matches and is the home ground of OFK Beograd. The stadium is capable of taking up to 19,100 people, but has a total of 10,600 seats. As of December 2012, the stadium is in deteriorating condition and can only hold a third of its intended capacity.

See also
 List of football stadiums in Serbia

References

External links

 OFK Beograd Official Website
 Sačuvajmo Omladinski stadion - stadion Beograda!

OFK Beograd
Football venues in Serbia
Football venues in Serbia and Montenegro
Athletics (track and field) venues in Serbia and Montenegro
Football venues in Yugoslavia
Athletics (track and field) venues in Yugoslavia
Sports venues in Belgrade
Sport in Belgrade
Multi-purpose stadiums in Serbia
Sports venues completed in 1957
1957 establishments in Serbia
Palilula, Belgrade